The 2009 Virginia lieutenant gubernatorial election resulted in Republican Bill Bolling defeating Democrat Jody Wagner.

Candidates 
 Jody Wagner (Democratic), former state Treasurer and state Secretary of Finance.
 Bill Bolling (Republican), incumbent Lieutenant Governor

Results

References

2009 Virginia elections
Virginia lieutenant gubernatorial elections
Virginia